Gim Jongjik (Hangul:김종직, 1431–1492), often known by his pen name Jeompiljae(점필재), was a leading Korean Neo-Confucian scholar in the early Joseon Dynasty.  He was born in Miryang in Gyeongsang province, to a yangban family of the Seonsan Gim lineage.  He passed the jinsa literary licentiate examination in 1453 and the higher examination in 1459.  

After passing the examination, Gim entered government service, holding a wide range of positions.  He earned the special favor of King Seongjong, as well as the enmity of the Hungupa (Loyal Retainers) faction.

After his death, Gim Jongjik's writings became the basis for the First Literati Purge of 1498 under the rule of Prince Yeonsan who then became the tenth king of Joseon as Yunsangun. His students included Kim Ilson who was killed in the first Korean literati purge, and Gim Goeng-pil, who was killed in the subsequent Second Literati Purge or Gapja massacre of scholar along with many others.  Later Gim Jongjik's memory was rehabilitated, and he was enshrined in various seowon including Yerim Seowon in Miryang and Geumo Seowon in Gumi.

Works 
 Jeompiljaejip (점필재집, 佔畢齋集)
 Cheonggupunga (청구풍아, 靑丘風雅)
 Dongmunsu (동문수, 東文粹)
 Danghuilgi (당후일기)
 Yuduyurok (유두유록, 遊頭流錄)
 Gihaengrok (기행록, 紀行錄)

See also
Korean Literati Purges
Joseon Dynasty politics
List of Korean philosophers
Korean Confucianism
 Nam Gon
 Jo Gwang-jo

External links

Naver Encyclopedia entry
 Gim Jongjik Memorial Museum 

1431 births
1492 deaths
Neo-Confucian scholars
Korean Confucianists
15th-century Korean poets
15th-century Korean calligraphers
15th-century Korean philosophers